The 1998 World Karate Championships are the 14th edition of the World Karate Championships, and were held in Rio de Janeiro, Brazil from October 15 to October 18, 1998.

Medalists

Men

Women

Medal table

References

External links
 World Karate Federation
 Karate Records – World Championship 1998
 Results

World Championships
World Karate Championships
World Karate Championships
World Karate Championships
Karate Championships
20th century in Rio de Janeiro
Karate competitions in Brazil